First Family is an unofficial title for the family of the family of the head of state or head of government of a country.

First Family may also refer to:
 First Family (film), a 1980 comedy film by Buck Henry
 The First Family (TV series), a 2012 syndicated sitcom by Byron Allen
 The First Family (professional wrestling), a professional wrestling stable
 The First Family (album), a 1962 comedy album by Vaughn Meader
 AL 333, a hominin fossil find of Australopithecus afarensis from Hadar, Ethiopia is commonly called "First Family"
 First Family (comics), a superhero team from Kurt Busiek's Astro City
 Nickname for the Fantastic Four
 First Families of Virginia
 First Families of Boston
 First Family (novel), a 2009 novel by David Baldacci
 Adam and Eve and their children, the first humans created according to Christianity